Cannabivarin (CBV), also known as cannabivarol, is considered a non-psychoactive cannabinoid — it does not produce the euphoric side effects found in THC. Minor amounts of CBV are found in the hemp plant Cannabis sativa. It is an analog of cannabinol (CBN) with the side chain shortened by two methylene bridges (-CH2-). CBV is an oxidation product of tetrahydrocannabivarin (THCV, THV).

Chemistry 
It has no double bond isomers nor stereoisomers.

Legal status
It is not scheduled by Convention on Psychotropic Substances.

United States
CBV is not scheduled at the federal level in the United States, but it could be considered an analog (of THC), in which case, sales or possession intended for human consumption could be prosecuted under the Federal Analog Act.

See also 
 Cannabinoids
 Cannabis
 Medical cannabis

References

External links 
 Erowid Compounds found in Cannabis sativa

Phytocannabinoids
Benzochromenes
Phenols